Jennifer Jacobs is an American journalist who is currently a senior White House correspondent for Bloomberg News.

Early life and education 
Jacobs received a BA in English Language and Literature from Iowa State University in 1993.

Career 
Jacobs started her journalism as a general assignment reporter for The Waterloo-Cedar Falls Courier in 1993 where she covered metro news and city government, before becoming a reporter at  The Post-Standard in Syracuse in 1999.

Jacobs became a political reporter for The Des Moines Register in 2004, where she covered the Iowa legislature and state government, until she moved into national politics following the Iowa caucuses when she was appointed chief politics reporter in 2011.

Jacobs became a national political reporter for Bloomberg several months ahead of the 2016 presidential election. She was quickly appointed a White House reporter, and in December 2019 Politico observed that she was "seen within the press corps as having one of the best relationships with Trump and his staff." Jacobs has appeared on PBS, CNN and MSNBC.

Jacobs became the target of ire by the Trump 2020 presidential campaign after Bloomberg News announced it would not conduct reporting on any 2020 Democratic presidential candidates after its owner, Michael Bloomberg, announced he was running for president. In February 2020, Jacobs was escorted out of a Trump campaign press conference in Iowa.

In October 2020, Jacobs broke the story that Hope Hicks, a senior White House official and close confidante of Donald Trump, had been diagnosed with the coronavirus. Shortly thereafter, multiple senior Republicans and Trump administration officials, including Trump himself, said they had been infected too. Noting that the administration had attempted to prevent this information from becoming public,  New York Magazine stated that without Jacobs' scoop, "the world might still be in the dark" about the White House COVID-19 outbreak.

References

External links 
 
 

Living people
People from Iowa
Iowa State University alumni
American women journalists
American newspaper journalists
American political journalists
Bloomberg L.P. people
Year of birth missing (living people)
21st-century American women